Euriphene incerta, the uncertain nymph, is a butterfly in the family Nymphalidae. It is found in Sierra Leone, Ivory Coast, Ghana, Nigeria, Cameroon, the Republic of the Congo, Equatorial Guinea, the Democratic Republic of the Congo and Zambia. The habitat consists of wetter forests.

The larvae feed on Uapaca species.

Subspecies
Euriphene incerta incerta (Sierra Leone, Ivory Coast, Ghana, Nigeria, Cameroon, Congo, Democratic Republic of the Congo: Equateur, Tshuapa, Tshopo, Uele, Ituri)
Euriphene incerta biokensis Hecq, 1994 (Bioko)
Euriphene incerta theodota (Hulstaert, 1924) (Zambia, Democratic Republic of the Congo: south to Lomami, Lualaba and Sankuru)

References

Butterflies described in 1912
Euriphene